Eudiscoelius is an Australasian genus of potter wasps. They are notable for their strongly metallic green to violet bodies. The following species are among those included in Eudiscoelius:

 Eudiscoelius bismarcki Giordani Soika, 1995
 Eudiscoelius elegans (Smith, 1861)
 Eudiscoelius elegantulus (Dalla Torre, 1894)
 Eudiscoelius ferrugineipes Giordani Soika, 1995
 Eudiscoelius gilberti (Turner, 1908)
 Eudiscoelius lucens Giordani Soika, 1995
 Eudiscoelius pulcherrimus Giordani Soika, 1995
 Eudiscoelius rechbergi (Meade-Waldo, 1910)
 Eudiscoelius saussurei (Kirsch, 1878)
 Eudiscoelius solomon Giordani Soika, 1995
 Eudiscoelius violaceus (Schulthess, 1903)
 Eudiscoelius viridipes (Cameron, 1911)
 Eudiscoelius viridis (Smith, 1858)

References

Potter wasps